Streblote polydora is a moth of the family Lasiocampidae first described by Herbert Druce in 1887. It is found in Angola, the Democratic Republic of the Congo, Eritrea, Mozambique, South Africa, Tanzania and Zimbabwe.

The larvae feed on Piliostigma thonningii.

References

Moths described in 1887
Lasiocampidae
Moths of Africa